Oldenberg is a German surname. Notable people with the surname include:

Claes Oldenberg (1929–2022), American sculptor
Henry Oldenburg (c. 1619–1677) German theologian, diplomat, natural philosopher, First Secretary of the Royal Society.
Hermann Oldenberg (1854–1920), German scholar of Indology (the study of the Indian subcontinent)
Lorenz Oldenberg (1863–1931), German entomologist

Other uses
Oldenberg Brewery, a defunct brewery and pub in Fort Mitchell, Kentucky, part of a Greater Cincinnati tourist expansion.

See also
Oldenburg (disambiguation)

References

German-language surnames